Babensham is a municipality in the district of Rosenheim in Bavaria in Germany. It lies on the river Inn.

References

Rosenheim (district)
Populated places on the Inn (river)